The Blob (Frederick J. "Fred" Dukes) is a fictional character appearing in American comic books published by Marvel Comics. The character is usually depicted as an adversary of the X-Men. A mutant originally depicted as a fat circus freak, the Blob claims to be immovable when he so desires. He possesses an extreme amount of pliable body mass, which grants him superhuman strength. Possessing the demeanor of a bully, he mostly uses his powers for petty crime and as a member of the Brotherhood of Mutants and Freedom Force.

The Blob appeared in the 2009 superhero film X-Men Origins: Wolverine, where he was played by actor Kevin Durand wearing a fat suit. Wrestler "Giant" Gustav Claude Ouimet had a cameo as Blob in X-Men: Apocalypse.

Publication history
Created by writer Stan Lee and artist Jack Kirby, he first appeared in X-Men #3 (January 1964).

Fictional character biography

Early years
Born in Lubbock, Texas, Fred J. Dukes starts out as a member of a circus sideshow under the name "The Blob". His act was that he could remain stationary when others tried to move him. He is detected and contacted by Charles Xavier via Cyclops, who sees his performance and tells him that he (Dukes) is a mutant, and asks him to join the X-Men. At the X-Mansion, the other X-Men dislike Dukes for his obnoxious attitude. Iceman uses his power against Dukes to create an ice block around his foot, but the Blob easily escapes. The Blob refuses Xavier's invitation, saying he is better than the other X-Men. When Xavier tries erasing his mind of what has transpired, the Blob escapes the X-Mansion despite the efforts of the Beast and uses the sewer to get away without being followed. He tells the manager of the carnival he is taking over, then gathers up the other circus members and they attack the Xavier School for Gifted Youngsters, as he plans to get technology from the X-Men and take over the world. Meanwhile, Xavier works on a device which will allow him to erase the memories of many people. The carnival succeeds in defeating the X-Men despite a warning from Angel. They tie up the X-Men and leave them on the lawn. They then enter the X-Mansion to find the Professor and his technology. Xavier telepathically contacts Marvel Girl and tells her to remove her blindfold using her telekinesis, then levitate a knife from a performer's tent to cut through her bonds, after which she frees the other members. Xavier is able to wipe everyone's minds after the carnival is stopped by a wall of ice, and the Blob goes back to the circus.

Joining the Brotherhood
The mutant Magneto soon seeks out the Blob to recruit him into his Brotherhood of Evil Mutants, restoring his memory through a jarring blow to the head. The Blob temporarily accepts the invitation, but leaves when it is revealed that Magneto has no real concern for the Blob's safety after he is hit by explosives which were launched at the X-Men. He goes back to the Circus. He teams up with Unus due to the alien Lucifer, who soon becomes his confidant. They disguise themselves as X-Men and commit crimes. The Blob also serves as a member of Factor Three. He briefly works as an operative for the Secret Empire, where he fights the Beast. With the reorganized Brotherhood, the Blob fights Professor X and the Defenders. He is reverted to infancy by Alpha the Ultimate Mutant. The Blob is later returned to adulthood, and fights the Champions of Los Angeles.

He later winds up in prison, but is freed by Mystique to recruit him into her incarnation of the Brotherhood. He becomes part of the plot to assassinate Senator Kelly, the event which leads to the apocalyptic alternate future of Days of Future Past. He also battles the Avengers as a member of the Brotherhood. With Unus, he battles the Hulk. With the Brotherhood, he battles the X-Men once more. He witnesses the apparent death of Unus, then goes berserk and attacks Spider-Man and the Black Cat.

He remains with the Brotherhood, becoming a special operative of the federal government when the Brotherhood is reformed as the government-sponsored Freedom Force. On the team's first mission, they help capture Magneto. They then battle the X-Men in San Francisco. Blob also participates in Freedom Force's capture of the Avengers for the federal government. With Freedom Force, he attempts to capture Rusty Collins, then battles X-Factor. With Freedom Force, he battles the X-Men in San Francisco, and later assists in the attempt to arrest the X-Men in Dallas, battling the New Mutants in Dallas as well. He battles X-Factor again, and under Spiral's orders, he and Pyro battle Daredevil in an attempt to capture a young mutant. He again attempts to arrest Rusty Collins, fighting the New Mutants again. He joins Avalanche and Pyro in attacking Avengers headquarters. With Freedom Force, he finally captures Rusty Collins and fellow New Mutant Skids. He helps to capture Cable, but is defeated by Cable and then by Sunspot during an attempt to recapture Cable. With Freedom Force, he assists in thwarting a jailbreak from the Vault.

After Freedom Force's dissolution, the Blob participates in other versions of the Brotherhood, including one led by Toad and another led by Professor X; the Blob takes over as leader of the latter when Xavier leaves.

The psychic entity Onslaught later recruits Blob, vastly upgrading his powers and abilities (in his powered-up state, his mutation becomes virtually identical to that of Phat). During this time, the Blob fights the various members of X-Force and is soundly defeated in each encounter. Months later, a powered-down Dukes joins the new Brotherhood led once again by Mystique, alongside Toad, Sabretooth, and the daughter of the original Mastermind.

When Exodus recreates the Brotherhood of Mutants, Blob offers to join but is quickly dismissed by Exodus, who considers him useless. This is a major blow to Dukes' already weak self-esteem, for which he seeks the counsel of therapist Sean Garrison. After a session, Blob attacks the Xavier Institute, though he is defeated by the combined efforts of the New Mutants and the Hellions. He is then arrested by S.H.I.E.L.D.

Post M-Day
Due to the Scarlet Witch's depowering of 90% of Earth's mutants, the Blob is one of the thousands to lose their power, though his epidermis does not shrink to compensate for his loss of mass, leaving him with huge folds of loose skin. The depressed Blob attempts to commit suicide, but his skin folds prevent him from cutting through to any major blood vessels on his throat or wrists.

Someone that resembles the Blob is seen apprehended by the Thunderbolts and is seen in the Folding Castle's Detention Quadrant.

Blob later resurfaces as a member of X-Cell, a group of depowered mutants that blames the government for the loss of their powers, attacking Mutant Town in defiance of the Decimation. After mistakenly getting into a fight with Rictor and Multiple Man and getting in a cheap shot on Rictor, he stole a car. With fellow X-Cell member Fatale, he attempted to flee, eventually hitting an open manhole (left open earlier in the day by Strong Guy and Wolfsbane) and causing the car to crash leaving Blob hanging from the car. When both of them ran afoul of Marrow, Blob was thrown from the car.

Through unknown means, Dukes loses the excess skin and his fortunes turn in his favor. Now known as Freddie Dukes, he has become a weight-loss guru in Japan, and is to star in an upcoming movie filmed in San Francisco made by Kingo Sunen. He is also seen with Magneto and the High Evolutionary.

In the miniseries "Magneto: Not a Hero", Joseph is resurrected under unknown circumstances and forms a new Brotherhood of Mutants with Astra and mutated deformed versions of Blob, Mastermind, Quicksilver, Scarlet Witch, and Toad. It is soon revealed that these actually are clones created by Joseph.

In Uncanny X-Men #16, Fred Dukes is working with Mystique in Genosha and is once again shown as heavily obese and appears to have his powers restored. Mystique has supplied him with Mutant Growth Hormones (MGH) extracted from Dazzler.

Blob was later seen on Krakoa. He and Anole become the co-owners and bartenders of the tiki bar called Green Lagoon.

Powers and abilities
The Blob's mutant physiology grants him a number of advantages. He had superhuman strength, endurance, and great resistance to physical injury. The Blob's elastic, blubbery skin is difficult to penetrate by gunfire, missiles, and even Wolverine's claws, though with sufficient force and a favorable angle, the claws can lacerate his flesh. On one occasion, a concentrated optic blast fired by Cyclops was sufficient to puncture a hole through his shoulder, much to the shock of Dukes himself. The magic swords of both Black Raazer and the Arabian Knight were able to harm him.

He could also alter his personal mono-directional gravity field beneath himself to make himself virtually immovable as long as he was in contact with the ground, although an incredible force can uproot him, along with a chunk of whatever he is standing on. The only beings on record to have been able to move the Blob against his wishes are the Hulk, Juggernaut, and Strong Guy (powered-up near his limit by absorbing kinetic energy), although Colossus has managed to lift Dukes by digging underground and raising the piece of earth Dukes stands on, stating this as an exception to his immovability. Magneto once was able to move the Blob by lifting the ground under the Blob's feet via metal pipes. Despite his appearance, the Blob's speed and agility are those of a fairly athletic male of normal stature, a fact which frequently catches his opponents by surprise.

The Blob's superhuman strength greatly increased over the years, in a manner similar to that of the Thing. This improvement is said to be a result of his ongoing mutation.

The Blob is vulnerable to attacks directed at his face, as his eyes, nose, mouth, and ears do not have the same protection as the rest of his body. Dukes is also susceptible to psionic attacks and psychic manipulation, and he can be incapacitated by sensory assaults; for example, Banshee was able to render Blob unconscious solely through the use of his sonic scream. On another occasion, Sleepwalker defeated the Blob by using warp beams to wrap a steel girder around the villain, crushing his blubber and causing him great physical pain. The Hulk once took the opposite approach, harming the Blob by grabbing and stretching his flab. While he is all but invulnerable to direct kinetic attacks, such as punches, kicks or gunshots, he is susceptible to concussions and other harm resulting from sufficiently powerful impacts, as Daredevil knocked him out by luring him underneath a massive bell and then having it dropped on him with the aid of a young female mutant.

Dukes can be incapacitated by drinking alcohol, although due to his immense mass, a large amount of alcohol is required.

Reception
 In 2018, CBR.com ranked Blob 9th in their "Age Of Apocalypse: The 30 Strongest Characters In Marvel's Coolest Alternate World" list.

Other versions

Age of Apocalypse
Blob appears briefly in the Age of Apocalypse as a test subject that Henry McCoy was toying with in the Breeding Pens in a direct violation of the Kelly Pact that Apocalypse signed to keep the Human High Council occupied and at bay while he rallied his forces.

McCoy considered Blob's mutation useless which enraged Blob. Dukes freed himself, and attacked his experimenter. Havok came to McCoy's rescue, but Dukes proved to be even too much for the Prelate to handle. His pseudo freedom was fleeting because moments later the head of the pens, Havok's older brother Cyclops, showed up to deliver a searing optic blast that would put him back in his place.

When the Age of Apocalypse was revisited in the 10th anniversary, Blob was a member of Sinister's team known as Sinister Six. It appears that McCoy or Sinister himself had his powers altered in a manner that allowed Blob to project his gravitational field outward. When the Sinister Six met the X-Men in battle, Dukes' new powers were used to sweep the X-Men off their feet with the Silver Samurai receiving a double dose. Quicksilver attempted to fell the behemoth with multiple punches, but Dukes remained standing regardless of how many hits he got in. It was not until Rogue stepped in with a punch that had the power necessary to overtake him that the mammoth would topple over. Following the Sinister Six's defeat, Blob managed to escape.

Later he's seen as a member of the Black Legion, a group of psychotic altered mutants under the supervision of a now insane Weapon X. It is also revealed that he left the Age of Apocalypse timeline and joined Archangel's quest to become the new heir of Apocalypse. He's seen in Akkaba Metropolis under the North Pole and he was the one to prevent the escape of Psylocke.

In the "Final Execution Saga" story line in Uncanny X-Force, Fredrick is part of a new Brotherhood of Evil Mutants led by Daken with the aim of taking down X-Force and turning Evan Sabahnur into a new Apocalypse. During the saga the X-Force team is captured and tortured after Nightcrawler from the Age of Apocalypse universe betrays the team, to get his revenge on Fredrick due to him eating his wife Linda. Kurt seemingly succeeds in his goal of revenge by teleporting a live shark into Fredrick's stomach during a fight with him, causing him to be devoured from within.

Cable & Deadpool
Deadpool's search for Cable across alternate timelines forces an encounter with the Blob of "an age of Apocalypse" (not to be confused with the X-Men story arc of the same name). In this reality, Blob has taken the mantle of Famine, one of the Horsemen of Apocalypse.

House of M
Put in an internment camp after Bolivar Trask's rise to power in the House of M reality, he was freed in Magneto's first major raid on US soil. After being freed, he first took his mutant name, "Blob" and was instrumental in the destruction of several Sentinels. He then joined Magneto's mutant group. Blob is seen as a member of the Genoshan Black Ops version of the Marauders. It was later revealed that Dukes is also a member of an NYPD strike team called the Brotherhood.

Marvel Noir
Eric Magnus is Chief of Detectives and Fred appears as a member of his Brotherhood, a cabal of bent policemen. He is initially partnered with rookie Detective Peter Magnus, and later with Detective Mortimer Toynbee.

Marvel Zombies
Blob appears twice in the Marvel Zombies universe. He is alive when first encountered, but being pursued by several zombie versions of Marvel characters, including Pyro, Black Cat, Iron Fist, Toad and Rhino. He is later seen as a zombie fighting the X-Men.

Ultimate Marvel

The Ultimate Universe version of Blob, real name Franklin Dukes, is a member of the Brotherhood of Mutant Supremacy. His powers are similar to that of his Earth-616 counterpart, although he has been moved by a helicopter during the Weapon X saga, suggesting that he may be less powerful. He seems to eat constantly, and is often seen browsing the internet or chatting to people via instant messaging. One such incident sees the Blob pretend to be a female model/physicist named Naomi who cyber-seduces the X-Man Beast—leading to the discovery of Magneto's survival and to the Ultimate War saga. Unlike his Earth-616 counterpart, the Blob may very well have additional superhuman-eating powers as part of his mutation, as not only has he threatened to actually eat his enemies alive, but it was expressly stated that he had personally consumed all of the Weapon X computers in a matter of moments when the Brotherhood invaded the Weapon X compound to rescue the X-Men. In Ultimatum, the Blob is seen eating the Wasp, proving the cannibalistic claims are true. However, Hank Pym grows to a gigantic size and bites the Blob's head off in return.

It was revealed that Blob was Liz Allan's estranged genetic father after she discovered her own mutant abilities. He had impregnated Liz's mother while working for a circus sideshow. It was also shown that the Blob fathered a son (Theodore "Tubby Teddy" Allan) by an unknown woman. Teddy is in high school and has his father's same bulky appearance and similar abilities, as he was shot at point blank range and merely said "It tickles". He later joins Quicksilver's new Brotherhood as the new iteration of Blob.

Planet X
Blob is an enforcer on the alternate universe when the Apocalypse Twins skew the time lines and create a mutant utopia.

Amazing Spider-Man: Renew Your Vows
In the second volume of Amazing Spider-Man: Renew Your Vows, Blob is seen as a member of the Brotherhood of Mutants.

Age of X-Man
In the alternate universe created by Nate Grey in Age of X-Man, Blob is the leader of the X-Tremists. This version of Fred Dukes is a dramatic departure from previous representations; he is "soft-hearted, bookish, kind and gentle". Blob has romantic feelings for his teammate Betsy Braddock. According to X-Tremists writer Leah Williams, "My hope in removing the villainy aspects of his character for X-tremists was to make people confront how they feel about fatness in general by utilizing an intriguing aspect of AoX: there is no bodily prejudice."

In other media

Television
 The Blob makes a cameo appearance in the Spider-Man and His Amazing Friends episode "The Prison Plot". This version is a member of the Brotherhood of Evil Mutants.
 The Blob appears in X-Men: Pryde of the X-Men, voiced by Alan Oppenheimer. This version is a member of the Brotherhood of Mutant Terrorists.
 The Blob appears in X-Men: The Animated Series, voiced by Robert Cait. This version is a member of the Brotherhood of Evil Mutants.
 A teenage incarnation of the Blob appears in X-Men: Evolution, voiced by Michael Dobson. This version is a high school bully and member of the Brotherhood of Bayville who possesses a sensitive side and self-esteem issues. In a flash-forward depicted in the two-part series finale "Ascension", he and the Brotherhood have reformed and joined S.H.I.E.L.D.
 The Blob appears in Wolverine and the X-Men, voiced by Stephen Stanton. This version is a member of the Brotherhood of Mutants.

Film

 The Blob appears in an early draft for X-Men (2000), written by Andrew Kevin Walker in 1994.
 Frederick J. Dukes appears in X-Men Origins: Wolverine, portrayed by Kevin Durand. This version is initially a muscular soldier and member of Team X before the team disbanded, leading to him developing an eating disorder, becoming overweight, and undergoing boxing training at John Wraith's suggestion. Additionally, Dukes dislikes being called "Blob".
 The Blob makes a cameo appearance in X-Men: Apocalypse, portrayed by wrestler "Giant" Gustav Claude Ouimet. This version is a cage fighter.

Video games
 The Blob appears as a recurring boss in X-Men (1992).
 The Blob appears in X-Men: Reign of Apocalypse.
 The Blob appears in X-Men: Mutant Academy 2 as part of the "poolside" stage. 
 The Blob appears as an unlockable playable character in X-Men: Next Dimension. This version is a member of the Brotherhood of Mutants.
 The Blob appears as a boss in X-Men Legends, voiced by Mark Klastorin. This version is a member of the Brotherhood of Mutants.
 The Blob makes a cameo appearance in X-Men Legends II: Rise of Apocalypse, voiced by Peter Lurie. This version is a member of the Brotherhood of Mutants.
 The Blob appears as a boss in the X-Men Origins: Wolverine film tie-in game, voiced by Gregg Berger. In the PS3, Xbox 360 and PC versions, he has taken up residence in a grocery store in Elgin, Illinois. In the Wii and PS2 versions, he resides in a boxing ring in Las Vegas.
 The Blob appears as a boss in Marvel: Avengers Alliance. This version is a member of the Brotherhood of Mutants.
 The Blob appears in Marvel Heroes, voiced by Fred Tatasciore.
 The Blob appears in Lego Marvel Super Heroes, voiced again by Stephen Stanton. This version is a member of the Brotherhood of Mutants.
 The Blob appears in Pinball FX 2 via the X-Men table.
 The Blob appears as a playable character in Marvel Puzzle Quest.

Miscellaneous
The Blob appears in a holodeck simulation depicted in the crossover novel Planet X.

Merchandise
 The Blob received a build-a-figure in the Marvel Legends line.
 The X-Men: The Animated Series incarnation of the Blob received an action figure.
 The X-Men: Evolution incarnation of the Blob received an action figure.
 The Blob received a figure in a "Deluxe Twin Pack" along with Sabretooth as part of the X-Men Origins: Wolverine tie-in toy line.

References

External links
 Blob at Marvel.com

Characters created by Jack Kirby
Characters created by Stan Lee
Comics characters introduced in 1964
Fictional attempted suicides
Fictional characters from Texas
Fictional characters with gravity abilities
Fictional characters with slowed ageing
Fictional characters with superhuman durability or invulnerability
Fictional circus performers
Fictional henchmen
Fictional secret agents and spies
Male characters in comics
Male film villains
Marvel Comics characters with superhuman strength
Marvel Comics film characters
Marvel Comics male supervillains
Marvel Comics mutants
X-Men supporting characters